{{DISPLAYTITLE:C5H9NO3}}
The molecular formula C5H9NO3 (molar mass : 131.13 g/mol) may refer to:

 Aminolevulinic acid, first compound in the porphyrin synthesis pathway
 Glutamate-1-semialdehyde
 Glutamate-5-semialdehyde
 Hydroxyproline